Blanc-Sablon Bay is a natural bay in municipality of Blanc-Sablon, in Le Golfe-du-Saint-Laurent Regional County Municipality, on the Côte-Nord (North-Shore) coast of Gulf of Saint Lawrence, in the province of Quebec, Canada.

Geography

The "Bay of Blanc-Sablon" is the most easterly bay of the Quebec. The village of Blanc-Sablon is located on the bay. Blanc-Sablon Bay is bounded between Point Morel (west side) and the Pointe St. Charles (East side). The bay is located opposite the Bois Island, which serves to protect the bay from heavy seas. Blanc-Sablon Bay includes Morel and Cove Harbour Job's Room. The bottom of the bay is located just 1.6 km from the border Quebec - Labrador; this boundary pass at the eastern limit of the bay.

The long dock of the bay hosts ferries, including one linking Saint-Augustin, Côte-Nord, Quebec, on the Côte-Nord (North-Shore) of Quebec and the other one linking St. Barbe, Newfoundland and Labrador.

See also

Related articles
 Blanc-Sablon, Quebec
 Côte-Nord (North-Shore), administrative region
 Gulf of Saint Lawrence
 Strait of Belle Isle
 Brador River
 Blanc-Sablon River
 Border between Quebec and Newfoundland-and-Labrador
 Lourdes-de-Blanc-Sablon Airport

References

Bays of Quebec